Trust often refers to:

 Trust (social science), confidence in or dependence on a person or quality

It may also refer to:

Business and law
 Trust law, a body of law one person holds property for the benefit of another
 Trust (business), the combination of several businesses under the same management to prevent competition

Arts, entertainment, and media
 The Trust, a fictional entity in the Stargate franchise
Trust (novel), 2022 novel by Hernan Diaz
 Trust (magazine), a free tri-annual investment trust magazine

Films
 The Trust (1915 film), a lost silent drama film
 Trust (1976 film), a Finnish-Soviet historical drama
 Trust (1990 film), a dark romantic comedy
 The Trust (1993 film), an American drama about a murder in 1900
 Trust (1999 film), a British television crime drama
 Trust, a 2009 film starring Jamie Luner and Nels Lennarson
 Trust (2010 film), a drama film directed by David Schwimmer
 The Trust (2016 film), a film starring Nicolas Cage and Elijah Wood
 Trust (2021 film), a drama film directed by Brian DeCubellis

Music

Artists
 Trust (Belgian band), a pop music group formed in 2007
 Trust (Canadian band), a synthpop music group formed in 2010
 Trust (French band), a rock music group formed in 1977
 The Trust (music production duo), a U.S. music production duo

Albums
 Trust (Alfie Boe album), 2013
 Trust (Boney James album), 1992
 Trust (Brother Beyond album), 1989
 Trust (Elvis Costello album), 1981
 Trust (Jaci Velasquez album), 2017
 Trust (Low album), 2002
 Trust (Saga album), 2006

Songs
 "Trust" (Ayumi Hamasaki song), 1998
 "Trust" (Brother Beyond song), 1990
 "Trust" (Keyshia Cole and Monica song), 2008
 "Trust" (KMFDM song), 1995
 "Trust" (Megadeth song), 1997
 "Trust" (Pharcyde song), 2000
 "Trust", English version title of Lara Fabian's song "Croire"
 "Trust", on Adema's eponymous album
 "Trust", on The Cure's album Wish
 "Trust", on Justin Bieber's album Purpose
 "Trust", on L'Arc-en-Ciel's album Awake
 "Trust", on Nightingale's album White Darkness
 "Trust", on Prince's album Batman
 "Trust", on Thrice's album The Illusion of Safety
 "Trust", on GFriend's album Snowflake
 "Trust", on Jonas Brothers' album Happiness Begins
 "Trust", a song by "Fivio Foreign"
 "Trust", on Bad Gyal's album Worldwide Angel
 "Trust", on Sevendust's album Animosity

Television
 Trust (game show), French game show aired in 2012
 Trust (British TV series), a 2003 UK legal drama
 Trust (American TV series), a 2018 FX series
 "Trust" (Justified), an episode of the TV series Justified
 "Trust" (Revenge), a 2011 episode of the American television series
 "Trust", a 2005 episode of the ABC Family drama television series Wildfire

Brands and enterprises
 Trust (electronics company), a European producer and designer of computer peripherals and accessories, mainly in the low-budget market
 Trust Company Ltd., a car parts company

Computing
 TRUST, a computer system for tracking trains
 Computational trust, generation of trusted authorities or user trust through cryptography
 Trust metric, a measurement of the degree to which group members trust each other, as in online networking
 Trusted system, a computerized system relied on to enforce a security policy
 Web of trust, a system used in cryptography to establish authenticity
 WOT Services or Web of trust, a crowdsourced Internet website reputation rating tool

Government and political organizations
 Trust (British political party), formed by Stuart Wheeler in 2010
 Trust (Greek political party), a Muslim party in the Rhodope region
 Trust (parliamentary group), a Ukrainian parliamentary group and political party
 NHS trust, a public health organization
 Operation Trust, a Soviet counter-intelligence operation

Places
 Trust, North Carolina, a community in the United States

See also
 Trieste United States Troops, a 1947–1953 US Army occupation unit
 Trust Company (disambiguation)
 Trustee (disambiguation)
 Trusteeship (disambiguation)
 Trustor (disambiguation)
 Truss (disambiguation)
 National Trust (disambiguation)
 TRST (disambiguation)

tr:Tröst